Themes - Volume 1: March 79 - April 82 is box set released by Simple Minds. It was released on 24 September 1990 by Virgin Records. It documented the band's developing sound, ideas and ideals through their classic 12″ single releases.

Track listing

Notes

References

Themes - Volume 1: March 79 - April 82 at The Official Site

1990 compilation albums
Simple Minds compilation albums
Virgin Records compilation albums